Katie Grays Dorsett (July 8, 1932 – July 6, 2020) was a Democratic member of the North Carolina General Assembly representing the state's twenty-eighth Senate district from 2003 to 2010. Her district included constituents in Guilford County, North Carolina. In the 2009–10 session, Dorsett served as the Majority Whip in the Senate.

Education and career
Dorsett was born in Shaw, Mississippi. She attended local public schools up to the eighth grade and then a private boarding school. Dorsett attended Alcorn State University for her undergraduate work and then earned her master's from Indiana University. After attending several schools in pursuit of her doctorate, she eventually finished at the University of North Carolina at Greensboro in 1975. Dorsett taught business at North Carolina State A&T University in Greensboro, North Carolina, from 1955 until 1987.

Political career
After retiring from A&T after 32 years of service, she served two terms on the Greensboro City Council from 1983 to 1986, the first African American woman ever elected. She then served as a Democratic Guilford County Commissioner starting in 1990. Dorsett represented District 9 until 1992, when she was appointed Secretary of the Department of Administration by North Carolina Governor Jim Hunt. This position made her the first African American woman to hold a North Carolina Cabinet post. She was elected to the state Senate in 2002.

Just before filing ended in 2010, she announced that she would not seek re-election. She was inducted into the North Carolina Women's Hall of Fame in 2010. She died on July 6, 2020, two days before her 88th birthday.

References

External links
Civil Rights Greensboro: Katie G. Dorsett
North Carolina General Assembly - Senator Katie G. Dorsett official NC Senate website
Project Vote Smart - Senator Katie G. Dorsett (NC) profile
Follow the Money - Katie G. Dorsett
2008 2006 2004 2002 campaign contributions
Oral History with Katie G. Dorsett

County commissioners in North Carolina
Greensboro, North Carolina City Council members
Democratic Party North Carolina state senators
State cabinet secretaries of North Carolina
1932 births
2020 deaths
Alcorn State University alumni
Indiana University alumni
North Carolina A&T State University faculty
University of North Carolina at Greensboro alumni
Women state legislators in North Carolina
21st-century American politicians
21st-century American women politicians
People from Shaw, Mississippi
American women academics